Bermejo is a city in Bolivia, south of the Tariquía Flora and Fauna National Reserve. It is in a broad, open valley of the Cordillera Central range that extends southward into Argentina, and is on the Bermejo River, locally the border between Bolivia and Argentina.

It is served by Bermejo Airport.

References

External links 
 Account of a trip to the city of Bermejo in 2016 (in Spanish)

Populated places in Tarija Department
Argentina–Bolivia border crossings